Indonesian migrant worker (formerly known as Tenaga Kerja Indonesia, TKI) are Indonesian citizens that work in foreign countries outside of Indonesia.

The large population of Indonesia as the world's 4th largest, has contributed to the surplus of workforces in Indonesia. This large workforce, combined with scarcity and unavailability of jobs at home, has led numbers of Indonesians to seek job abroad, to earn money to improve their economy. However this Indonesian migrant workers are mostly low-skilled and works in domestic sector. They are prone to exploitation, extortion, physical and sexual abuses, suffered by those enduring human trafficking. Several cases of abuses upon Indonesian migrant worker has been reported and some has gained worldwide attention.

It is estimated around 4.5 million Indonesians work abroad. Most of them (around 70%) are women, most are employed in domestic sector as maid or domestic helper and manufacture sector. Most of them aged in productive age margin, between 18 and 35 years old. However it is estimated some of them might be under aged through document falsification. Around 30% are men, mostly work in plantation, construction, transportation and service sector.

Since 1969, the government of Indonesia has administered the recruitment of migrant labour. The public programme is widely criticized to prioritize the rights of private recruitment agents over the migrant workers they recruit.

Statistics
Currently Malaysia employs the largest numbers of Indonesian migrant workers, followed by Taiwan, Saudi Arabia, Hong Kong, and Singapore. It is important to note that these are official numbers, the actual numbers might be far larger contributed by unrecorded illegal entry of Indonesian workers into foreign countries.

Employer countries
Source:BNP2TKI

 to 31 October

Job sector

 to 31 October

In popular culture 

 Nadila, a character in Kakushigoto: My Dad's Secret Ambition, is an Indonesian migrant worker who works as a housekeeper in Japan.

See also
 Overseas Indonesians
 Human trafficking in Indonesia
 Erwiana Sulistyaningsih
 Overseas Filipino Worker (OFW) – Filipino version of migrant worker

Notes

External links
 BNP2TKI National Body for Placement and Protection of Indonesian Workers
 Migrant Care NGO focused on migrant worker issues
 MTO Resource for Remittance comparison for Overseas Indonesians
 Merchantrade Money Transfer Money Transfer Service Provider

Migrant workers
Labour in Indonesia